Evolution was an American villainous professional wrestling stable in WWE which was a part of the Raw brand from 2003 to 2005, as well as during 2007 and 2014.

At the height of its original existence, the group consisted of Triple H, Ric Flair, Batista and Randy Orton. The group has been referred to as a modern iteration of Flair's former stable, The Four Horsemen. Evolution slowly began dissolving in the summer of 2004 and lost their respective titles (Intercontinental Championship, World Heavyweight Championship and World Tag Team Championship) to Edge, Chris Benoit, and the team of Booker T and Rob Van Dam respectively. Evolution turned on Orton the night following SummerSlam, when he won the World Heavyweight Championship and kicked him out of the group. After winning the Royal Rumble in 2005 and teasing that he would chase the WWE Championship, Batista turned on Triple H and decided to pursue the World Heavyweight Championship himself. Although Batista's departure was largely the end for the group, the final break up came when Triple H turned on and attacked Flair. During the breakup, each member faced one another at least once.

Evolution later reformed on April 14, 2014 as a sub-group to The Authority after Batista joined forces with Triple H and Orton. Flair did not participate in the reunion, as he had retired from full participation in wrestling in 2012. In October 2018, the original four members of the group reunited to celebrate the 1000th episode of SmackDown Live. As of 2022, only Triple H and Randy Orton currently work with WWE among the former members of Evolution.

Concept 
Each member of Evolution represented the best in: "the past" (Ric Flair), "the present" (Triple H), and "the future" (Randy Orton and Batista) of professional wrestling. Triple H would reveal on his 2013 Triple H - Thy Kingdom Come DVD that Mark Jindrak was originally planned to be in the group in Batista's role as the Arn Anderson-like enforcer, with Jindrak even shooting vignettes with the rest of the group, before it was decided to make Batista part of the group instead. This was further elaborated in 2020, when it was revealed that Vince McMahon wanted Jindrak in the group to replace Batista due to his triceps injuries in 2003. However, Triple H felt that Jindrak was not mature enough for the group and also felt that he was dragging Orton down, an assessment mutually agreed by Jindrak himself. Ultimately, management decided to place Jindrak in a tag team with Garrison Cade while the rest of Evolution waited for Batista to return to health, which proved to work out for all parties involved, including Jindrak, who would become a major star in Mexico following his WWE departure in 2005.

Flair's character trademarks of coming out in suits and being a noted Playboy, along with his and Triple H's trademark heel ruthlessness, were traits that carried over into the entire stable, both during and for a couple of years after Evolution.

History

Formation (2002–2003)

At Unforgiven in 2002, Triple H defended the World Heavyweight Championship against Rob Van Dam. During the match, Ric Flair came down to the ring and grabbed the sledgehammer from Triple H and teased hitting him before hitting Van Dam, allowing Triple H to get the win. From that point on, Flair accompanied Triple H to the ring as his manager. Shortly after, Batista moved from SmackDown! to Raw and Flair also began accompanying him to the ring while continuing to second Triple H. On January 20, 2003, Randy Orton joined Triple H, Flair, and Batista in attacking Scott Steiner to complete the group. Two weeks later the group got its name when Triple H, after the group jumped Tommy Dreamer, spoke about how the four men were examples of pro wrestling's evolution from the past (Flair) to the present (himself) to the future (Batista and Orton). On the May 26 episode of Raw, Orton attacked both Shawn Michaels and Kevin Nash after a two-on-one handicap match with Michaels and Flair (who eventually turned on Michaels during the match) taking on Triple H. Batista was out for nearly eight months because he retore his triceps while rehabilitating the injury.

Dominance (2003–2005) 

In 2003, at Bad Blood, Flair was able to defeat Shawn Michaels after Orton struck Michaels with a chair. Later that night, Triple H retained his World Heavyweight Championship in a Hell in a Cell match against Kevin Nash. At Unforgiven, Orton, who began developing a "Legend Killer" gimmick, defeated Michaels to prove that he was indeed a Legend Killer. Later that night, Triple H defended the World Heavyweight Championship against Goldberg, to whom he lost the title. On the September 29 episode of Raw, Triple H issued a $100,000 bounty to anybody who could take out Goldberg. Three weeks later, Batista made his return during a match between Goldberg and Michaels and attacked the champion, finishing by stomping on a steel chair with Goldberg's ankle sandwiched in it to claim the bounty. At Survivor Series, Orton participated in a Team Bischoff versus Team Austin elimination tag team match in which Orton was the sole survivor. Later that night, Goldberg faced Triple H in a rematch from Unforgiven for the World Heavyweight Championship which Goldberg won despite repeated interference from Flair, Orton, and Batista.
In June 2003, Evolution decided to try and recruit Kane. After unsuccessful attempts, Triple H would face Kane in a match with a Title vs. Mask stipulation. After defeating Kane he would finally be unmasked completely for the audience to see.
At the height of Evolution's power, the group controlled all of the male-based championships of Raw after Armageddon. Batista teamed with Flair to win the World Tag Team Championship from the Dudley Boyz (Bubba Ray Dudley and D-Von Dudley) in a Tag Team Turmoil match, Orton captured the Intercontinental Championship from Rob Van Dam, and Triple H regained the World Heavyweight Championship from Goldberg (in a Triple Threat match that also involved Kane), with the help of the other members.

In January 2004 at the Royal Rumble, Flair and Batista successfully defended the World Tag Team Championship against the Dudley Boyz in a Tables match, and World Heavyweight Champion Triple H fought Shawn Michaels to no contest in a Last Man Standing match, thus retaining the championship. Flair and Batista exchanged the World Tag Team Championships with Booker T and Rob Van Dam. At WrestleMania XX, Evolution defeated the Rock 'n' Sock Connection (The Rock and Mick Foley) in a 3-on-2 handicap match. Later that night, Triple H lost the World Heavyweight Championship to Chris Benoit (in a triple threat match that also involved Shawn Michaels) when he tapped out to the Crippler Crossface. At Backlash, Flair lost to Shelton Benjamin in one-on-one action. Later that night, Orton defended the Intercontinental Championship successfully against Cactus Jack (Mick Foley) in a Hardcore match, while Chris Benoit retained the World Heavyweight Championship in a triple threat match against Triple H and Shawn Michaels, this time forcing Michaels to submit with the Sharpshooter.
Triple H and Shawn Michaels would later continue their feud at Bad Blood inside a Hell in a Cell, which was won by Triple H and thus ending their feud.

While still World Heavyweight Champion, Benoit teamed with Edge to take the World Tag Team Championship from Flair and Batista. In mid-2004, Eugene befriended Triple H. At Vengeance, it was revealed that Triple H used him. The angle concluded after Eugene accidentally caused Triple H's loss to Chris Benoit at Vengeance. On the same night, Edge defeated Randy Orton to end his seven-month-long Intercontinental Championship reign.

Triple H received one final shot at the World Heavyweight Championship, on the July 26, 2004 episode of Raw in an Iron Man match. Earlier that night, Orton won a number-one contender battle royal for the World Heavyweight Championship so a title match between Triple H and Orton could have taken place at SummerSlam. However, Eugene interfered in the Iron Man match and helped Benoit take the lead and retain the title in the final seconds. As a result, the main event of SummerSlam was a title match between Benoit and Orton. At SummerSlam, Orton pinned Benoit to become the new World Heavyweight Champion and the youngest World Champion in WWE history to date. On the August 16, 2004 episode of Raw, Orton was kicked out of Evolution following a successful defense of the title against Chris Benoit. Batista hoisted Orton on to his shoulders in what appeared to be a celebration, but following the thumbs down from Triple H, the group proceeded to attack Orton. The next week on Raw, Triple H demanded that Randy Orton "make the right decision" and give him the World Heavyweight Championship belt. In return he would forget Orton ever existed. Orton refused and then spat in Triple H's face. Afterwards, backstage Triple H was livid and demanded Eric Bischoff resolve this. Bischoff said he would and promised Triple H a match against Orton at Unforgiven for the World Heavyweight Championship.

At Unforgiven, Triple H beat Orton to regain the World Heavyweight Championship, with help from Flair, Batista, and Jonathan Coachman. Orton's feud with Evolution continued until Survivor Series where Triple H, Batista, Gene Snitsky, and Edge were defeated by Orton, Maven, Chris Jericho, and Chris Benoit in a Survivor Series match for control of Raw over the following month.

On the December 6 episode of Raw, the World Heavyweight Championship was vacated when a triple threat match the previous week with Triple H, Edge, and Benoit ended in a double pin (Edge tapped out to Benoit's Crippler Crossface while he had Benoit pinned to the ground), and the title was to be decided in an Elimination Chamber match at New Year's Revolution in early 2005.

Breakup (2005) 

In the Elimination Chamber match at New Year's Revolution, Batista, Orton, and Triple H were the last three remaining in the match. Orton eliminated Batista with a RKO and Triple H pinned Orton with Batista's help to win the title. On the following night's Raw, a number-one contender's match saw Orton pin Batista to gain a title shot at the Royal Rumble. Triple H suggested that Batista not enter the Royal Rumble match, wanting the group to focus on Triple H retaining the title. Batista declined, entered the Royal Rumble match at number 28 and won, last eliminating John Cena. Earlier as part of the match's storyline, Orton was concussed and then pinned to have Triple H retain the title, finally ending their feud.

Triple H tried to persuade Batista to challenge the WWE Champion John "Bradshaw" Layfield and John Cena of SmackDown! rather than for his World Heavyweight Championship. This involved Triple H plotting a feud between JBL and Batista, showing JBL badmouthing Batista in an interview and staging an attack on Batista with a limousine designed to look like JBL's. The scheme was unsuccessful and at the brand contract signing ceremony, Batista chose to remain on Raw, powerbombing Triple H through a table and thus quitting the faction. Batista defeated Triple H for the World Heavyweight Championship at WrestleMania 21, then defended and retained the title in rematches at Backlash, and Vengeance in a Hell in a Cell match. Triple H and Batista made peace backstage afterwards and ended their feud. Batista was drafted to SmackDown! as the last pick in the 2005 WWE draft lottery ending Triple H's World Heavyweight Championship pursuits.

After Vengeance, Triple H took time off, Flair turned face before going on to win the Intercontinental Championship at Unforgiven, and the group was dissolved. Triple H returned at the "WWE Homecoming" episode of Raw on October 3, where he teamed with Flair in a tag team match in a winning effort against Carlito and Chris Masters. After the match, Triple H betrayed Flair and attacked him with a sledgehammer, marking the end of Evolution. Flair would then go on to defeat Triple H in a Steel Cage match for the Intercontinental Championship at Taboo Tuesday. Triple H then defeated Flair in a Last Man Standing match at Survivor Series.

Subsequent reunions and interactions (2007, 2010, 2013)

On December 10, 2007, Evolution had an in-ring reunion as faces on the Raw 15th Anniversary special episode. After Batista, Flair, and Triple H, who turned face himself in summer 2006 when he reunited with Shawn Michaels to reform D-Generation X, made their way to the ring, Orton (who was still a heel) played footage of himself being attacked and kicked out of the group and said that he hadn't forgiven them for turning on him in 2004 and didn't trust them, to which Triple H responded that they found him annoying, so he partnered with Rated RKO member Edge and Umaga. Evolution won the match.

On the March 22, 2010 episode of Raw, Triple H teamed up with Orton, who was now a babyface, for one night only ahead of WrestleMania XXVI where they faced the team of Sheamus, Ted DiBiase and Cody Rhodes (Orton's now former partners) in a 2-on-3 Handicap match, which they lost.

At SummerSlam 2013, Triple H and Orton once again joined forces to form the heel stable The Authority.

In-ring reunion (2014)  

Seven years later, in April 2014, Triple H, Batista, and Randy Orton, now heels again, reformed their alliance after Daniel Bryan defeated all three of them in the same night to win the WWE World Heavyweight Championship in the main event of WrestleMania XXX. The night after WrestleMania on Raw, Batista and Orton teamed together to face The Usos for the WWE Tag Team Championship, but the match ended in a no contest due to both teams being counted out. Later that night, Batista and Orton, along with Kane, attacked Bryan before he was set to defend his title against Triple H. Before Triple H could defeat Bryan, The Shield interrupted by spearing him and taking out Orton, Batista, and Kane, causing Bryan to retain his title via no contest.

On the April 14 episode of Raw, Triple H, Randy Orton and Batista came down to the ring to attack The Shield after their 11-on-3 handicap match, using the name and the theme of Evolution. The Shield defeated Evolution in a six-man tag team match at Extreme Rules, and in a six-man No Holds Barred elimination tag match at Payback, in which none of The Shield were eliminated. On the June 2 episode of Raw, Batista quit the WWE (kayfabe) after his title match request was denied by Triple H due to Daniel Bryan's neck injury at the time rendering Bryan unable to complete. This was done to write Batista off WWE television so he could promote Guardians of the Galaxy. However, Batista would legitimately quit after an appearance at an NXT event on June 12 due to creative differences, and would not return to WWE until his one-off appearance at SmackDown 1000. Later that night, Triple H declared that he had resorted to "Plan B" in his quest to destroy The Shield, prompting Seth Rollins to attack Dean Ambrose and Roman Reigns.

Reunions (2018–present) 
It was announced on WWE's website and WWE Now on YouTube that Evolution would reunite for one night only on SmackDown's 1000th episode on October 16, 2018. During the episode, Evolution cut a promo where Batista stated Triple H had beaten everyone except for him (Batista), which led to both men staring each other down before they shook hands as Evolution's music played. Batista returned on the February 25 episode of Raw, attacking Flair and left him lying on the floor for WWE COO Triple H. On the March 4 episode of Raw, Triple H challenged Batista to a No Holds Barred match at WrestleMania 35 and Batista accepted under one condition that if Triple H lost, he'd be forced to retire. At the event, Triple H won after interference from Flair. After the match, Batista retired from professional wrestling.

On the June 15, 2020 episode of Raw, Flair returned trying to talk medically disqualified WWE legend Christian from returning to the ring due to his concussion issues, after the latter was goaded by Randy Orton earlier. Flair made one last apparent attempt right before the bell could sound. Flair would instead low blow Christian to set up Orton's punt kick, turning heel in the process and briefly reuniting half of Evolution. On the August 10 episode of Raw, Orton would betray Flair by low blowing him and punting him in the skull, thus ending their brief alliance and turning Flair face.

Legacy
As mentioned above, Evolution had dominated all the championships throughout the WWE in its existence. The concept would later passed over to The Undisputed Era who won all of NXT's male-based championships, The Bloodline who also held WWE's main and tag team championships minus the secondary titles and Toxic Attraction which also held all of NXT's female-based championships.

Championships and accomplishments 
 Pro Wrestling Illustrated
 Match of the Year (2004) 
 Feud of the Year (2004) – 
 Most Hated Wrestler of the Year (2003, 2004, 2005) – Triple H
 World Wrestling Entertainment
 World Heavyweight Championship (5 times) – Randy Orton (1), Triple H (4) 
 World Tag Team Championship (2 times) – Batista and Ric Flair
 WWE Intercontinental Championship (2 times) – Randy Orton (1), Ric Flair (1) 
 Royal Rumble (2005) – Batista
 Wrestling Observer Newsletter
 Feud of the Year (2004) 
 Feud of the Year (2005) 
 Most Overrated (2003, 2004) – Triple H
 Readers' Least Favorite Wrestler (2003) – Triple H
 Worst Match of the Year (2003)

References

External links 
 Triple H's WWE profile
 Randy Orton's WWE profile
 Batista's WWE profile
 Ric Flair's WWE profile

The Authority (professional wrestling) members
WWE teams and stables
WWE World Tag Team Champions